Mjøstårnet is an 18-storey mixed-use building in Brumunddal, Norway, completed in March 2019. Mjøstårnet translates as "the tower of lake Mjøsa". The building is named after Norway's biggest lake, which is 100km away from Oslo. 

The building offers a hotel, apartments, offices, a restaurant and common areas, as well as a swimming hall in the adjacent first-floor extension.

Mjøstårnet was designed by Norwegian studio Voll Arkitekter for AB Invest. Timber structures were installed by Norwegian firm Moelven Limtre, including load-bearing structures in glued laminated timber. Cross laminated timber were used for stairwells, elevator shafts and balconies.

As the main vertical/lateral structural elements and the floor spanning systems of Mjøstårnet are constructed from timber, the building is considered an all-timber structure. An all-timber structure may include the use of localized non-timber connections between timber elements. It may also include non-timber floors as long as the decks are supported by a primary structure made in timber (resting on timber beams). In Mjøstårnet, concrete slabs were used on the top seven floors in order to handle comfort criteria and acoustics.

However, this building is a timber-concrete composite building since it has a concrete core stabilizing the building, according to the definition of CTBUH.

References 

Buildings and structures in Innlandet
Wooden buildings and structures in Norway
Buildings and structures completed in 2019
Ringsaker
Hotels in Norway
2019 establishments in Norway
Plyscraper